SADS can refer to:

 Sads (band), a Japanese band
 Schedule for Affective Disorders and Schizophrenia
 SA.DS, silver acetylide double salt with silver nitrate, a primary explosive
 Sudden arrhythmic death syndrome
 Swine acute diarrhea syndrome coronavirus, a coronavirus emerging in China in 2018 fatal to swine

See also
SAD (disambiguation)